Gary Dale Boulanger (born November 19, 1967) is a Canadian Hall of Fame jockey and trainer who competed in his native Canada and the United States.

Born in Drayton Valley, Alberta, Canada, Boulanger began his career in 1987 at Tampa Bay Downs then went to the Pacific Northwest where he was the leading jockey for three straight years from 1989 through 1991 at Longacres Racetrack in Washington state. In 1991 he won 247 races, breaking Hall of Fame jockey Gary Stevens record for most wins.

In 1992 Boulanger moved to race at tracks in California and in 1994 to southern Florida where he enjoyed considerable success. In 1998 he rode Chilito in the Kentucky Derby. From June 2000 and much of 2001, Boulanger worked primarily in Canada where he rode the most successful mount of his career. Aboard Sam Son Farm's filly Dancethruthedawn he won several top races in Canada including the 2001 Canadian Oaks and that country's most important race, the Queen's Plate.

While competing in Florida in the winter of 2005, Gary Boulanger suffered a life-threatening and career-ending injury in a racing accident at Gulfstream Park in the January 30 running of the Mac Diarmida Handicap. Called "one of South Florida's best riders the past several years" by The New York Times, Boulanger underwent surgery for a ruptured spleen, broken ribs, as well as a detached tendon in his left elbow. The accident caused a blood clot, that surgeons had to extract, which necessitated the removal of a section of his skullcap to avoid damage to the brain from pressure caused by swelling. Following a very lengthy recovery process, in April 2009 Boulanger embarked on a new career race conditioning Thoroughbreds. In September he earned his first win as a trainer at Calder Race Course. On February 17, 2013, Boulanger returned to the saddle at Tampa Bay Downs, finishing 9th aboard Spring a Latch, a horse in which he is also trainer.

In 2017 he became the 33rd recipient of the Avelino Gomez Memorial Award given to jockeys who have made significant contributions to Canadian Thoroughbred racing.

In 2020, Gary Boulanger was inducted into the Canadian Horse Racing Hall of Fame.

References

Further reading
Jockey: The Rider's Life in American Thoroughbred Racing by Scott A. Gruender, 2006,

Year-end charts

1967 births
Living people
Canadian Horse Racing Hall of Fame inductees
Avelino Gomez Memorial Award winners
Canadian horse trainers
Canadian jockeys
Franco-Albertan people
People from Brazeau County